Sea Cliff is a station along the Oyster Bay Branch of the Long Island Rail Road. It is located on Sea Cliff Avenue and Glen Keith Road between Glen Cove Avenue and Cedar Swamp Road in the City of Glen Cove, New York, east of the Town of Oyster Bay hamlet of Sea Cliff, New York. The station was actually named after Sea Cliff Avenue, rather than the hamlet.

History
Sea Cliff station was built in 1867 by the Glen Cove Branch Rail Road, and renovated in May 1888 at the cost of $4,000. The station is typical of many LIRR stations of the late-Victorian era. It contains a two-story red brick structure with an gabled-roof that extended into canopies on the sides, which contains elaborate gingerbread woodwork along the canopies. From July 2, 1902 to December 31, 1924, it had connections to two trolley lines. One was the Sea Cliff Village Trolley, owned by the Nassau County Railway and the other was the Glen Cove Railroad (not to be confused with the old LIRR subsidiary) which ran along the Oyster Bay Branch right-of-way into Downtown Glen Cove in 1905. From 1909 to 1956, it also contained a wooden pedestrian bridge. Nearly a century after the second station was built, it was listed in the National Register of Historic Places. The station was renovated in 1997.

Platform and track configuration
This station has two high-level side platforms, each four cars long. There is a spur east of the station for track maintenance equipment, but was used as a freight siding until the 1970s. The siding at one point crossed Sea Cliff Avenue to service Sea Cliff Coal and Lumber, whose covered coal dump still stands.

References

External links

Sam Berliner III's Long Island Railroad page
1999 Sea Cliff Station Photos(Victorian Stations of the LIRR)
NRHP Landmark
Unofficial LIRR History Website
1999 Photo
2006 Handicapped ramp
Station Interior
Victorian-style overhead light
Sea Cliff LIRR Station (Road and Rail Pictures)
 Station from Sea Cliff Avenue from Google Maps Street View

Long Island Rail Road stations in Nassau County, New York
National Register of Historic Places in Oyster Bay (town), New York
Glen Cove, New York
Railway stations on the National Register of Historic Places in New York (state)
Railway stations in the United States opened in 1867
1867 establishments in New York (state)